Baldovan railway station, later renamed Baldovan and Downfield, served the northern suburbs of Dundee around Strathmartine, including Bridgefoot, Downfield and Baldovan,  in the Scottish county of Angus. Services were provided by the Dundee and Newtyle Railway.

History

Opened by the Dundee and Newtyle Railway and absorbed into the Caledonian Railway, it became part of the London, Midland and Scottish Railway during the Grouping of 1923. Passing on to the Scottish Region of British Railways on nationalisation in 1948, it was then closed by the British Transport Commission.

The site today
The site today has been redeveloped as housing, with the address Hillview Terrace. The former railway line can be seen on aerial views of the site.

References

Notes

Sources 
 
 
 
 Station on navigable O. S. map Near Downfield

External links
 RAILSCOT on Dundee and Newtyle Railway

Disused railway stations in Angus, Scotland
Railway stations in Great Britain opened in 1831
Former Caledonian Railway stations
Railway stations in Great Britain closed in 1955
Disused railway stations in Dundee
1831 establishments in Scotland
1955 disestablishments in Scotland